Simen Berntsen (born 2 July 1976) is a retired Norwegian ski jumper.

In the World Cup he finished once among the top 10, with a tenth place at Oslo in March 1997. He finished second overall in the Continental Cup in the 1996/97 season.

External links

1976 births
Living people
Norwegian male ski jumpers